Roller sports (as Extreme sports) at the 2005 Asian Indoor Games was held in Suphanburi X-Games Sports Stadium, Suphanburi, Thailand from 15 November to 17 November 2005.

Medalists

Roller freestyle

Skateboarding

Medal table

Results

Roller freestyle

Park
15–17 November

Park best trick
17 November

Vert
15–16 November

 Panumas Vairojanakich of Thailand originally won the gold medal, but was disqualified after he tested positive for Cannabinoid.

Skateboarding

Park
16–17 November

Park best trick
16 November

References

 2005 Asian Indoor Games official website
 Chinese Mountaineering Association

2005 Asian Indoor Games events
Asian Indoor Games